Hyalophane or jaloallofane is a crystalline mineral, part of the feldspar group of tectosilicates. It is considered a barium-rich potassium feldspar. The name hyalophane comes from the Greek , meaning "glass", and  meaning "to appear".

An occurrence of hyalophane was discovered in 1855 in Lengenbach Quarry, Imfield, Binn valley, municipality of Binn, Canton of Valais, Switzerland. The mineral is found predominantly in Europe, with occurrences in Switzerland, Australia, Bosnia, Germany, Japan, New Jersey, and the west coast of North America. Hyalophane may be found in manganese deposits in compact metamorphic zones.

Hyalophane has a monoclinic crystallography, with cell properties a = 8.52 Å, b = 12.95 Å, c = 7.14 Å, and β = 116°. Optically, the material exhibits biaxial birefringence, with refractive index values of nα = 1.542, nβ = 1.545, and nγ = 1.547 and a maximum birefringence of δ = 0.005. It has weak dispersion and low surface relief.

Hyalophane has sometimes been used as a gemstone.

References

Tectosilicates
Barium minerals
Feldspar
Gemstones
Monoclinic minerals
Minerals in space group 12